Florence E. Moore (November 13, 1886 – March 23, 1935) was an American vaudeville, Broadway performer, and actress in silent films.

Biography
Born in Philadelphia, Pennsylvania, Moore began singing in the choir of Saint Clement's Church, Philadelphia at the age of thirteen. She began touring with the stock company of her brother, Frank. Florence got her first opportunity in Moscow, Idaho, when a male member of the cast failed to appear. Thereafter she was a regular with the company, playing the role of a Chinese without pay.

Her first Broadway appearance came in 1912, as Clorinda Scribblem in Hanky Panky. During the next twenty years she participated in numerous productions. As a comedian she performed in musical comedies, revues on Broadway, and headlined as a vaudeville actress while touring America. While working in The Champagne Girls, Florence met and married William J. Montgomery and they became part of a popular vaudeville team. She divorced Montgomery and married John O. Kerner. Later she was separated from Kerner. Records show that she was also married to Jules I. Schwob.

To theatregoers in New York, New York Florence is perhaps best known for being the first female emcee at the Palace Theatre. as well as her performance in Parlor, Bedroom and Bath. The production debuted in New York and played for two years on the road. Her final appearance on the New York stage came in 1932, in a revival of Cradle Snatchers. She starred in the role of Mary Boland which had been created seven years earlier.

As a motion picture actress Moore had a brief career. Films in which she appeared are The Old Melody (1913) opposite King Baggot, The Weakness of Strength (1916), and The Secret of Eve (1917) opposite Olga Petrova. She belonged to the Actors' Equity Association and the Twelfth Night Club.

Florence Moore died in the Fitzgerald Mercy Hospital in Darby, Pennsylvania in 1935, aged forty eight. Death followed an operation for cancer.

Filmography

References

External links

1886 births
1935 deaths
19th-century American singers
19th-century American women singers
American stage actresses
American film actresses
American silent film actresses
Vaudeville performers
Actresses from Philadelphia
Deaths from cancer in Pennsylvania
20th-century American actresses
19th-century American women